Agia Anna is a village in the Larnaca District of Cyprus, 16 km west of Larnaca. Its population in 2011 was 339.

References

Communities in Larnaca District